Henry Joseph Simon (August 25, 1862 - January 1, 1925) was a Major League Baseball outfielder. In 1887, he played in three games for the Cleveland Blues, then in 1890 he split the season between the Brooklyn Gladiators and Syracuse Stars. Simon's minor league baseball career spanned twenty seasons, from  until .

Sources

Major League Baseball outfielders
Cleveland Blues (1887–88) players
Brooklyn Gladiators players
Syracuse Stars (AA) players
Utica Pent Ups players
Syracuse Stars (minor league baseball) players
Rochester Jingoes players
Elmira Gladiators players
Troy Trojans (minor league) players
Troy Washerwomen players
Scranton Indians players
Bangor Millionaires players
Hartford Bluebirds players
Taunton Herrings players
Utica Pentups players
Utica Reds players
Albany Senators players
Utica Pent-Ups players
Baseball players from New York (state)
1862 births
1925 deaths
19th-century baseball players